Jan Kiszka (1552–1592) was a politician, magnate, patron, and benefactor of Polish brethren in the 16th century Polish–Lithuanian Commonwealth. Kiszka served as Carver of Lithuania from 1569, Royal Deputy Cupbearer of Lithuania and Elder of Samogitia from 1579, castellan of Vilnius from 1588, voivode of Brest 1589. The builder of Lubcha Castle in Belarus.

He was the son of Stanisław Kiszka. In 1575 he married Elżbieta Ostrogska.

External links 
 Biography

1552 births
1592 deaths
Ruthenian nobility of the Polish–Lithuanian Commonwealth
Polish Unitarians
Jan
Elders of Samogitia